Parazoa (Parazoa, gr. Παρα-, para, "next to", and ζωα, zoa, "animal") are a taxon with sub-kingdom category that is located at the base of the phylogenetic tree of the animal kingdom in opposition to the sub-kingdom Eumetazoa; they group together the most primitive forms, characterized by not having proper tissues or that, in any case, these tissues are only partially differentiated. They generally group a single phylum, Porifera, which lack muscles, nerves and internal organs, which in many cases resembles a cell colony rather than a multicellular organism itself. All other animals are eumetazoans, which do have differentiated tissues.

On occasion, Parazoa reunites Porifera with Archaeocyatha, a group of extinct sponges sometimes considered a separate phylum. In other cases, Placozoa is included, depending on the authors.

Porifera and Archaeocyatha
Porifera and Archaeocyatha show similarities such as benthic and sessile habitat and the presence of pores, with differences such as the presence of internal walls and septa in Archaeocyatha. They have been considered separate phyla, however, the consensus is growing that Archaeocyatha was in fact a type of sponge that can be classified into Porifera.

Porifera and Placozoa
Some authors include in Parazoa the poriferous or sponge phyla and Placozoa—comprising only the Trichoplax adhaerens species – on the basis of shared primitive characteristics: Both are simple, show a lack of true tissues and organs, have both asexual and sexual reproduction, and are invariably aquatic. As animals, they are a group that in various studies are at the base of the phylogenetic tree, albeit in a paraphyletic form. Of this group only surviving sponges, which belong to the phylum Porifera, and Trichoplax in the phylum Placozoa.

Parazoa do not show any body symmetry (they are asymmetric); all other groups of animals show some kind of symmetry. There are currently 5000 species, 150 of which are freshwater. The larvae are planktonic and the adults are sessile. The Parazoa–Eumetazoa division has been estimated to be 940 million years ago.

The Parazoa group is now considered paraphyletic. When referenced, it is sometimes considered an equivalent to the Porifera.

Some authors include the Placozoa, a phylum consisting of a single species, Trichoplax adhaerens, in the division, but sometimes it is also placed in the Agnotozoa subkingdom.

Phylogeny
According to the most up-to-date phylogeny, Porifera should not have a direct relationship with Placozoa. In any case, placozoans have simplified coelenterates without common characteristics with sponges.

References

External links

Parazoa